Webequie Airport  is located  south southwest of the First Nations community of Webequie, Ontario, Canada.

Airlines and destinations

References

Certified airports in Kenora District